George Washington Shell (November 13, 1831 – December 15, 1899) was a U.S. Representative from South Carolina.

Life
Born near Laurens, South Carolina, Shell attended the common schools and Laurens Academy.
He engaged in agricultural pursuits.
He entered the Confederate States Army as a private in April 1861 and served throughout the Civil War, attaining the rank of captain.
He resumed agricultural pursuits.

In 1875, he and his brother were charged with the assassination of politician Joseph Crews; a jury acquitted them both after a half-hour of deliberation.

He served as member of the State Democratic executive committee in 1886 and 1887.
Chosen president of the State Farmers' Association in 1888.
He served as clerk of court of Laurens County 1888-1896.

Shell was elected as a Democrat to the Fifty-second and Fifty-third Congresses (March 4, 1891 – March 3, 1895).
He served as chairman of the Committee on Ventilation and Acoustics (Fifty-third Congress).
He was not a candidate for renomination in 1894.
He retired to his plantation near Laurens, South Carolina, and died there December 15, 1899.
He was interred in Chestnut Ridge Cemetery.

Notes

Sources

External links

 

1831 births
1899 deaths
Confederate States Army officers
Democratic Party members of the United States House of Representatives from South Carolina
People of South Carolina in the American Civil War
People from Laurens, South Carolina
19th-century American politicians
People acquitted of murder